Bắc Trung Bộ (literally North Central Region, and often translated as North Central Coast) is one of the regions of Vietnam. It consists of six provinces in northern part of Central Vietnam: Thanh Hóa, Nghệ An, Hà Tĩnh, Quảng Bình, Quảng Trị, Thừa Thiên–Huế. The last two provinces were the northernmost provinces of South Vietnam until 1976. In the Nguyễn dynasty, this area (except Thừa Thiên) was known as Hữu Trực Kỳ (the area located in the left of Thừa Thiên).

Provinces

History
Four of the northernmost provinces of the north central coast region, fell within the communist-ruled North Vietnam (17th parallel), were hostile to the United States and ARVN forces throughout the Vietnam War as it was a NLF stronghold.

Culture
This region features three out of UNESCO's seven World Heritage Sites in Vietnam, namely: Phong Nha-Kẻ Bàng National Park (2003) under Natural, and Complex of Huế Monuments (1993) and Citadel of the Hồ Dynasty (2011) under Cultural.

Economy
The Bắc Trung Bộ region has the second lowest GDP per capita in the country, while the Northwest (Tây Bắc) region ranks the lowest GDP per capita.

Demographics

The monthly income for the North Central Coast is 902,900 VND compared with the whole country of 1,387,200 VND (2010).

The percentage of households with permanent housing for the North Central Coast is 75.6% compared with the whole country of 49.2% (2010).

The household size for the North Central Coast is 3.94 (2010).

The percentage of the population aged 15 years old and over obtained the following education in the North Central Coast: Never go to school 5.2%; Primary 19.3%; Lower secondary 33.1%; Upper secondary 17.3%; College, University 5.2%; Postgraduate 0.1% (2010).

The percentage of the population aged 15 years old and over work in the following industries: Agriculture 59.9%; Forestry 2.1%; Fishery 1.8%; Industry 7.5%; Construction 6.6%; Trade 7.7%; Services 14.5% (2010).

References

 
Regions of Vietnam
Geography of Vietnam